Groupe Madrigall is a French publishing holding company. It is the parent company of several publishing houses and distribution companies including: Éditions Gallimard, Flammarion and Casterman. Groupe Madrigall is the third largest French publishing group.

History
Groupe Madrigall is a holding company founded in 1992. It is controlled by Antoine Gallimard, director of Éditions Gallimard, and his sister Isabelle Gallimard, director of Mercure de France. Groupe Madrigall took over a majority share in Éditions Gallimard in the late 1990s. At the end of the 1990s, the Gallimard family repurchased shares from two of the company's three main corporate shareholders, namely the Italian publisher Einaudi (then owned by the holding company of Silvio Berlusconi, Fininvest via Arnoldo Mondadori Editore) and the French media agency Havas. Havas was forced to sell its shares after it was ruled that Havas's merger with Vivendi rendered it a direct competitor. As a result, Madrigall had a 60 percent majority holding in Éditions Gallimard. As a result, Madrigall had a 98 percent majority holding.

Structure 

 Publishing subsidiaries
 Éditions Gallimard
 Gallimard Jeunesse
 Gallimard Loisirs (tourist guides)
 Éditions Denoël
 Mercure de France
 Éditions de la Table ronde
 
 
 
 Les Grandes Personnes
 Éditions Flammarion
 
 
 
 Casterman
 

 Distribution subsidiaries
 Sodis
 Centre de diffusion de l'édition (CDE)
 France Édition Diffusion (FED)
 Sofédis
 Éditions Foliade (Belgium)
 Éditions des Cinq Frontières (Switzerland)
 Gallimard Limitée & Socadis (Canada)
 Union Distribution
 Flammarion Diffusion
 Eden Livres (electronic publishing)

 Bookstores, a total of eight, in Paris, Metz, Nancy and Strasbourg.

Footnotes

References

External links 
 

Companies based in Paris
French companies established in 1992
Holding companies established in 1992
Holding companies of France
Book publishing companies of France
Mass media in Paris